Arab Brazilians are Brazilian citizens of Arab ethnic, cultural, linguistic heritage and identity. The majority of Arab Brazilians trace their origin to the Levantine region of the Arab World, known in Arabic as Bilad al-Sham, primarily from Lebanon and Syria, as well as Palestine. Arab Brazilians are Christians in the great majority. The first Syrians and Lebanese arrived in São Paulo around 1880. It is not known exactly when, although the Syrians and Lebanese say that in 1885 there was a small core of peddlers working in the market square. By 1920, the census listed 50,246 Syrians and Lebanese in Brazil, 38.4% (2/5) of these in the state of São Paulo. The 1940 census enumerated 48,614 Syrians, Lebanese and other related groups with a decrease of approximately 1647 people. As immigration almost ceased after 1929 and the colony aged, it is surprising that the decline was not even greater. The trend of the period between 1920 and 1940 was the continuous concentration of Syrians and Lebanese in São Paulo. Almost half (49.3%) of Syrians and Lebanese residents in Brazil lived in São Paulo.

Contemporary data on the number of Arab descendants in Brazil is highly inconsistent. The national IBGE census has not questioned the ancestry of the Brazilian people for several decades, considering that immigration to Brazil declined almost to 0 in the second half of the 20th century. In the last census questioning ancestry, in 1940, 107,074 Brazilians said they were the children of a Syrian, Lebanese, Palestinian, Iraqi or Arab father. The native Arabs were 46,105 and the naturalized Brazilians, 5,447. Brazil had 41,169,321 inhabitants at the time of the census, so Arabs and children were 0.38% of Brazil's population in 1940. [2] Currently, many sources cite that millions of Brazilians are of Arab descent. Itamaraty claims that there are between 7 and 10 million Lebanese descendants in Brazil. [3] However, independent research, based on the interviewee's self-declaration, found much smaller numbers. According to a 2008 IBGE survey, 0.9% of the white Brazilians interviewed said they had a family background in Western Asia, which would give about one million people. [4] According to another 1999 survey by the sociologist and former president of the Brazilian Institute of Geography and Statistics (IBGE) Simon Schwartzman, only 0.48% of the interviewed Brazilians claimed to have Arab ancestry, a percentage that, in a population of about 200 million of Brazilians, would represent around 960 thousand people. [5]

History

Immigration to Brazil 
Arab immigration to Brazil started in the 1890s as Lebanese and Syrian people fled the political and economic instability caused by the collapse of the Ottoman Empire; the majority were Christian but there were also many Muslims. Immigration peaked around World War II.

19th century, most of them coming from Lebanon and Syria, later from other parts of the Arab world. When they were first processed in the ports of Brazil, they were counted as Turks because they carried passports issued by the Turkish Ottoman Empire that ruled the present day territories of Lebanon and Syria. There were many causes for Arabs to leave their homelands in the Ottoman Empire; overpopulation in Lebanon, conscription in Lebanon and Syria, and religious persecution by the Ottoman Turks. Arab immigration to Brazil grew also after World War I and the rest of the 20th century, and concentrated in the states of São Paulo, Mato Grosso do Sul, Minas Gerais, Goiás, and Rio de Janeiro.

Most Arab immigrants in Brazil were Christians, Muslims being a minority. Intermarriage between Brazilians of Arab descent and other Brazilians, regardless of ethnicity or religious affiliation, is very high; most Brazilians of Arab descent only have one parent of Arab origin. As a result of this, the new generations of Brazilians of Arab descent show marked language shift away from Arabic. Only a few speak any Arabic, and such knowledge is often limited to a few basic words. Instead the majority, especially those of younger generations, speak Portuguese as a first language.

The Brazilian and Lebanese governments claim there are 7 to 10 million Brazilians of Lebanese descent. Also, the Brazilian government claims there are 4 million Brazilians of Syrian descent. However, those numbers might an overestimate, given that an official survey conducted by the Brazilian Institute of Geography and Statistics (IBGE) in 2008 showed that less than 1 million Brazilians claimed any Middle-Eastern origin (only 0.9% of white Brazilian respondents said they had family origins in the Middle East).

Arabic influence in Brazil 

Arab immigration has influenced many aspects of Brazil's culture – besides and beyond the Arabic influence inherited via Portugal, as, for instance, some Portuguese words of Arabic origin.

In the main Brazilian cities it is easy to find restaurants that cook Arab food; and Arab dishes, such as sfihas (Portuguese esfirra), tabbouleh (Portuguese tabule), kibbeh (Portuguese quibe), hummus, tahina and halwa are very well known among Brazilians.

Most Arab immigrants in Brazil have worked as traders, roaming the vast country to sell textiles and clothes and open new markets. This economic history can be seen today in the ways that the São Paulo-based Arab Brazilian Chamber of Commerce has gained greater recognition in increasing Brazilian exports to the Arab world.

Arab-Brazilians are well integrated into Brazilian society. Today, only a minority of Arab Brazilians still know and speak the Arabic language, the vast majority of them being monolingual Portuguese speakers.

Many important Brazilians are of Arab descent, including important politicians such as Paulo Maluf, Geraldo Alckmin, Gilberto Kassab, former President Michel Temer, José Maria Alkmin, artists, writers (for instance Raduan Nassar) and models.

Notable Arab Brazilians

Adib Domingos Jatene, physician
Amyr Klink, sailor
Antônio Houaiss, writer and philologist
Arnaldo Jabor, film director, screenwriter and producer
Alfredo Saad-Filho, economist
Tania Khalill, actress
Branco, football world champion
Carlos Ghosn, businessman (former CEO of Renault and Nissan)
Bruna Abdullah, Hindi and Tamil language film actress
Daniella Sarahyba, model
Alberto Dualib, businessman
Beatriz Haddad Maia, tennis player
Rafael Leitão, Brazilian chess grandmaster
Guilherme Afif Domingos, politician
Paulo Maluf, politician and former governor of São Paulo
Geraldo Alckmin, former Governor of São Paulo
Gilberto Kassab, politician and former mayor of São Paulo
João Bosco, musician
José Maria Alkmin, politician, former Vice-President of Brazil under Castelo Branco
Juliana Paes, actress
Luciana Gimenez Morad, model and TV entertainer
Malu Mader, actress
Marcelle Bittar, model
Mário Zagallo, football player and coach world champion
Michel Temer, politician, former President of Brazil
Beto Carrero, entertainer, creator of the Beto Carrero World Park
Raduan Nassar, writer
Fagner, singer
Sabrina Sato Rahal, model and TV entertainer
Farid Zablith Filho, olympic swimmer
Tony Kanaan, race car driver
Wallid Ismail, martial artist, World class Brazilian jiu-jitsu practitioner, famous for choking Royce Gracie unconscious
Felipe Nasr, F1 Driver.
Ibrahim Abi-Ackel, politician

See also

Asian Brazilians
Arab diaspora
Demographics of Brazil
White Latin Americans
Lebanese Brazilians

References

Arab Brazilian
 
Ethnic groups in Brazil
Arab diaspora in South America